The Sabah Development Corridor or SDC (Malay: Koridor Pembangunan Sabah or Koridor Sabah) is a new development corridor in Sabah, Malaysia. The SDC was launched on 29 January 2008 by the Malaysian fifth Prime Minister, Abdullah Ahmad Badawi.

The project is expected to take 18 years with total investment of up to RM 105 billion. On average, starts from the year of 2009, RM5.83 billion will be allocated each year for development. 900,000 jobs are expected to be created with this project along with a waterfront city, tourism sub project and a Sabah Railway terminal. The project kick-started with the Prime Minister Abdullah Ahmad Badawi announcing that the government has allocated an extra RM 5 billion under the Ninth Malaysia Plan to improve infrastructure and lower the cost of doing business in the state.

Key objectives of the project are:
 make Sabah a gateway for trade, investment and tourism
 transform the state into a harmonious state regardless of race or religion
 create job opportunities in the state
 make the state more technology-savvy
 make the state a comfortable state to live in

See also 
 Ninth Malaysia Plan
 Iskandar Malaysia
 Northern Corridor Economic Region
 East Coast Economic Region
 Sarawak Corridor of Renewable Energy

References

External links
Sabah Development Corridor
Sabah Development Corridor Open Community

Development Corridors in Malaysia
Sabah
Prime Minister's Department (Malaysia)